Judge Wapner's Animal Court is a court show and spin-off of The People's Court. The program is presided over by Judge Joseph Wapner (better known for his tenure as the original judge of The People's Court). On Judge Wapner's Animal Court, he was accompanied by his bailiff Rusty Burrell—also a People's Court carryover—while hearing and ruling on real cases involving or about animals. The courtroom series was shown on Animal Planet for two seasons from 1998 to 2000.

References

External links

Animal Planet original programming
Court shows
1998 American television series debuts
2000 American television series endings
1990s American legal television series
2000s American legal television series
American television spin-offs